Escaldes–Engordany is one of the seven parishes of Andorra. The Escaldes–Engordany parish was founded on 14 June 1978 and has the second largest population after Andorra la Vella. The parish is composed of the areas les Escaldes, Engordany, Els Vilars d'Engordany, Engolasters, and El Fener. As of 2014 it has a population of 13,634. Notable events include the town's annual jazz festival. It borders four parishes: Encamp to the north and northeast, Sant Julià de Lòria in the southwest, Andorra la Vella in the west, and La Massana in the northwest. Also borders Catalonia, Spain in the east, south and southeast.

Geography

Climate
Escaldes–Engordany has a oceanic climate (Köppen climate classification Cfb).

Post Office
Andorra has no post offices of its own. Postal needs are served by Spanish P.O. (Correos Espanyols) or French P.O. (La Poste). 'Las Escaldes' Spanish Andorra Postal Agency opened in January 1928. Spanish Andorra Post Office is currently (2020) at 6 Carrer del Prat Gran, Les Escaldes, Escaldes–Engordany. Note: There has never been a French Andorra postal agency in Les Escaldes. Postal Code is AD700

Education

The Spanish international primary school Escuela Española de Escaldes serves the community.

Notable people 

 Pilar Burgués Monserrat (born Escaldes 1958) short story writer
 Antoni Martí (born 1963 in Escaldes-Engordany) architect and politician who was the Prime Minister of Andorra between May 2011 and May 2019.
 Ludmilla Lacueva Canut (born 1971) fiction and non-fiction writer

Sport 
 brothers Emili Pérez (born 1966) & Xavier Pérez (born 1968) former cyclists, competed at the 1988 & 1992 Summer Olympics
 Xavier Capdevila Romero (born 1976 in Canillo) from Escaldes–Engordany ski mountaineer.
 Ariadna Tudel Cuberes (born 1978 in Escaldes–Engordany) road cyclist and ski mountaineer.
 David Albós (born 1984 in Escaldes–Engordany) professional road racing cyclist.
 Sergi Moreno (born 1987 in Escaldes–Engordany) footballer
 Marc Vales (born 1990 in Les Escaldes) footballer
 Claudia Guri (born 1995 in Escaldes) athlete and former basketball player

References

External links

 
Parishes of Andorra
1978 establishments in Andorra